Siegfried Schäfer (born 16 February 1933) is a German wrestler. He competed in the men's Greco-Roman welterweight at the 1956 Summer Olympics.

References

External links
 

1933 births
Living people
German male sport wrestlers
Olympic wrestlers of the United Team of Germany
Wrestlers at the 1956 Summer Olympics
Place of birth missing (living people)